Margaret Hannah Fulford (June 14, 1904 – November 28, 1999) was an American bryologist who was active in identifying the flora of North and South America.

Biography
Fulford was born on June 14, 1904 in Cincinnati, Ohio. She subsequently attended the University of Cincinnati. She earned her BA in botany in 1926, BE in education in 1927, and returned for her MA in botany working under Emma Lucy Braun in 1928. She then attended Yale University to obtain her doctorate under Alexander William Evans, which she accomplished in 1935. Meanwhile, she worked at the University of Cincinnati as a botany instructor from 1927 to 1940. She became assistant professor in 1940, associate professor in 1946, professor in 1954, and professor emerita in 1974. She remained with the university until her death.

Fulford's focus was on morphology, ecology, and systematics of leafy hepatics. She intensely studied the reproduction and life cycle of the Hepaticae. She was a leading member of the Sullivant Moss Society, and was curator of the group's hepatics herbarium. Fulford was also a prominent bryology instructor at the University of Michigan Biological Station.

Fulford's work was published in journals such as The Bryologist, American Midland Naturalist, Ohio Journal of Science, Annales Bryologici, Lloydia, Torreya, Revue Bryologie et Lichenologique, and the Bulletin of the Torrey Botanical Club. Throughout her career, she published over 70 scholarly articles.

Legacy
The Margaret H. Fulford Herbarium at the University of Cincinnati was founded by her in the early 1920s, for which she remained as curator for most of her career. Her personal collection of liverworts is housed within the herbarium.

In 1992, botanist Stephan Robbert Gradstein published Fulfordianthus, which is a genus of liverworts in the family Lejeuneaceae. It is found in central and southern America, and named in Fulford's honour.

References 

1904 births
1999 deaths
American women botanists
Burials at Spring Grove Cemetery
Bryologists
20th-century American botanists
University of Cincinnati alumni
Yale University alumni
University of Cincinnati faculty
American women academics
20th-century American women scientists
Women bryologists
Scientists from Cincinnati
Academics from Ohio